Juan Ignacio Briones (born 16 January 1986 in Mar del Plata) is an Argentine footballer who played for Győri ETO FC.

Career
The right midfielder began his professional career in Spring 2007 with Club Atlético Aldosivi and signed in August 2010 for Győri ETO FC.

References

External links
 

1986 births
Living people
Sportspeople from Mar del Plata
Argentine footballers
Argentine expatriate footballers
Association football midfielders
Aldosivi footballers
Gimnasia y Esgrima de Mendoza footballers
Győri ETO FC players
Deportes Concepción (Chile) footballers
Expatriate footballers in Chile
Expatriate footballers in Hungary
Argentine expatriate sportspeople in Chile
Argentine expatriate sportspeople in Hungary